A number of ships with the name Essex served the British East India Company (EIC) as East Indiamen:

  — of 320 tons (bm), launched on the Thames in 1716; made four voyages for the EIC before she was sold.
  — of 570 tons (bm), launched by Brondson & Wells, Deptford, on 17 April 1744, in November 1780; she made four voyages for the EIC until 17 September 1755 when she was sold at Lloyd's Coffee House to breakers who promptly stripped her and broke her up.
  —  of 632 tons (bm), launched by Graves, Limehouse, on 3 August 1758; made four voyages for the EIC before she was sold for breaking up in 1770. She participated in the attack in 1762 that resulted in the British occupation of Manila
  made six voyages for the EIC and was sold in 1798 to be hulked or broken up. She was present at the battle of Porto Praya and participated in the action of 10 September 1782. 
  was launched on 7 February 1803 by Perry, Blackwell as an East Indiaman. She made seven voyages for the British East India Company (EIC) until on 20 August 1821 her register was cancelled as she had been demolished. She was reputed to have had the greatest spread of sail of any East Indiaman.

See also

Citations and references
Citations

References
 
Hardy, Charles and Horatio Charles Hardy (1811) A register of ships, employed in the service of the Honorable the United East India Company, from the year 1760 to 1810: with an appendix, containing a variety of particulars, and useful information interesting to those concerned with East India commerce. (London: Black, Parry, and Kingsbury).

Ships of the British East India Company
Age of Sail merchant ships
Merchant ships of the United Kingdom